Elsa Respighi (née Olivieri-Sangiacomo) (24 March 1894 – 17 March 1996) was an Italian  singer and composer.  She was the wife and former pupil of Ottorino Respighi.

Biography 
A singer (mezzo-soprano) and composer herself, Elsa Respighi created ballets out of Respighi's Ancient Airs and Dances suites and completed his final opera Lucrezia in 1937. Throughout her long life she championed her husband's work unfailingly. In 1955 she produced a memoir of her encounters with some of the most influential cultural figures of the early twentieth century. She also published a biography of Respighi in 1962.

In 1969 she established Fondo Respighi at the Fondazione Giorgio Cini in Venice, to promote music education in Italy. She was also at the forefront of the 1979 Respighi Centenary celebrations, which saw a number of long-neglected works performed and recorded for the first time. Since then, several of her own works, chiefly for solo voice with accompaniment, have been given their premiere.

Death 
She died one week short of her 102nd birthday in 1996.

Works

Elsa Respighi's works include:

References

Italian women classical composers
Italian centenarians
Italian mezzo-sopranos
20th-century Italian composers
20th-century Italian women singers
Women centenarians
1894 births
1996 deaths
20th-century women composers